The Amphitheatre is a large bowl-shaped depression, 0.75 nautical miles (1.4 km) in diameter, at the south side of the head of Northeast Glacier on Graham Land in Antarctica. The feature lies adjacent to former bases of the British Graham Land Expedition (BGLE), 1934–37, and the United States Antarctic Service (USAS), 1939–41, and was charted by USAS sledging parties which crossed Graham Land via Northeast Glacier and Bills Gulch. Named by the Falkland Islands Dependencies Survey (FIDS) following its survey in 1946.

Structural basins of Antarctica
Landforms of Graham Land
Fallières Coast